Enter Laughing is a 1967 comedy film, directed by Carl Reiner, based on his autobiographical novel and the 1963 stage play of the same name. It was Reiner's directorial debut.

The film stars Jose Ferrer, Shelley Winters, Elaine May, Jack Gilford, Janet Margolin and newcomer Reni Santoni. It tells the story of a young Jewish man from the Bronx trying to break into the theater and launch a career in acting.

The film has never been released on DVD or Blu-Ray.

Plot
David Kolowitz works as a delivery boy and assistant for a machine shop in New York City in 1938, and is fascinated with the movies.

Despite the misgivings of his girlfriend Wanda, his parents, and his employer, David follows the suggestion of a friend and becomes involved with an off-Broadway theater company run by Harrison B. Marlowe. He admires Ronald Colman so he uses the stage name "Donald Colman".

It is a margin operation that requires him to pay $5 a week for "tuition". Marlowe's daughter Angela takes a romantic interest in David, who perseveres despite a lack of acting talent and the hostility of Marlowe.

Overcoming all the difficulties, he makes his acting debut and his parents and girlfriend accept his new interest. In the end Angela waives David's tuition fee, allowing him to "act for nothing".

Cast
 Jose Ferrer as Harrison B. Marlowe
 Shelley Winters as Emma Kolowitz
 Elaine May as Angela Marlowe
 Jack Gilford as Mr. Foreman
 Janet Margolin as Wanda
 Reni Santoni as David Kolowitz
 David Opatoshu as Morris Kolowitz
 Don Rickles as Harry Hamburger
 Michael J. Pollard as Marvin
 Richard Deacon as Pike
 Nancy Kovack as Miss B
 Herbie Faye as Mr. Schoenbaum
 Rob Reiner as Clark Baxter
 Danny Stein as Spencer Reynolds
 Milton Frome as Policeman
 Lillian Adams as Theatergoer
 Mantan Moreland as Subway Rider
 Patrick Campbell as Butler
 Peter Brocco as Lawyer Peabody

Musical score and soundtrack

The film score was composed, arranged and conducted by Quincy Jones, and the soundtrack album was released on the Liberty label in 1967.

Track listing
All compositions by Quincy Jones except where noted
 "Enter Laughing" (Lyrics by Mack David) − 2:30
 "Exit Crying" 	2:27
 "Pennies from Heaven" (Arthur Johnston, Johnny Burke) − 2:27
 "David Dooze It" − 2:19
 "Main Title (Enter Laughing)" − 2:34
 "Enter Laughing" − 4:05
 "Ha-Cha-Cha" (Jerome Kern, Otto Harbach) − 2:17
 "Vienna Wails" − 2:15
 "I Hear You Calling" − 1:55
 "Enter Laughing (End Title) (Lyrics by Mack David) − 1:42

Personnel
Unidentified orchestra arranged and conducted by Quincy Jones including
Mel Carter (tracks 1 & 10), Carl Reiner (tracks 3 & 7) − vocals

See also
List of American films of 1967

References

External links
 
 
 

1967 films
1967 comedy films
American comedy films
Columbia Pictures films
1960s English-language films
Films scored by Quincy Jones
Films about actors
Films about Jews and Judaism
American films based on plays
Films directed by Carl Reiner
Films set in 1938
Films set in New York City
Films with screenplays by Carl Reiner
1967 directorial debut films
Films based on autobiographical novels
1960s American films